Litz can refer to:

People
 A. Walton Litz (1929–2014), American historian and educator
 Deacon Litz (1897–1967), American racecar driver.
 John Litz (born 1961), American politician.
 Nadia Litz (born 1976), American actress.
 Thomas Litz (born 1945), American figure skater.

Other
 Litz wire - a braided wire used in electronics.
 Litz, Oise, a commune in northern France
 Litz (Austria), a river in Austria
 "LITZ", a band from Baltimore, Maryland